Jens Ingwersen (17 August 1871 – 10 October 1956) was a Danish architect during the transition from neo-classicism to functionalism. 
He was the architect of the telephone company KTAS and is the man behind most of this company's buildings.

Biography
He was born at  Aggersbøl in  Vejle County, Denmark.  
He started his education at the Copenhagen Technical College from which he left in 1895. In the same year, he was admitted to the Royal Danish Academy of Fine Arts. He worked for various architectural and design firms including for Vilhelm Dahlerup in 1893–94,  Gotfred Tvede in 1894-96 and  Fritz Koch in 1896-1905 and at times at Caspar Leuning Borch.
He had an independent architectural firm in Copenhagen in 1905, from 1919 with Jørgen V. Jepsen as a partner.
He often appeared at the Charlottenborg Spring Exhibition. Ingwersen graduated from the Danish Art Academy in 1906. In 1917 he assisted  Jens Christian Rantzau  in a renovation of Krengerup manor on Funen. He was later made a Knight of the Dannebrog for his services to Danish architecture.

References

Danish architects
1871 births
1956 deaths
Knights of the Order of the Dannebrog
Royal Danish Academy of Fine Arts alumni
People from Vejle Municipality